Correa lawrenceana var. grampiana, commonly known as Grampians mountain-correa, is a variety of Correa lawrenceana that is endemic to Victoria, Australia. It is a shrub with elliptical leaves and cylindrical, velvety flowers covered with matted, woolly cream-coloured to yellowish brown hairs.

Description

Taxonomy
The variety was first formally described by Paul Wilson in the  journal Nuytsia in 1998, from specimens collected by David Albrecht on Mount William in 1986.

Distribution and habitat
This correa grows among rocks in mountains in the Grampians and on nearby Mount Langi Ghiran.

Conservation status 
The Grampians Correa is listed as  "Rare in Victoria" on the Department of Sustainability and Environment's Advisory List of Rare Or Threatened Plants In Victoria.

References

lawrenciana grampiana
Flora of Victoria (Australia)
Taxa named by Paul G. Wilson
Plants described in 1998